Sam Hecht, born in London 1969, is a British industrial designer. Hecht and his partner Kim Colin are the founders of a London design studio called Industrial Facility. Clients include Muji, Yamaha, LaCie, Emeco, Established & Sons, Issey Miyake, Epson, Magis, Lexon, Whirlpool, and Wästberg.

Biographical detail 
Hecht studied at Central Saint Martins College of Art and Design and received his degree in industrial design from the Royal College of Art in London.

He worked for architect David Chipperfield and travelled in the US and Japan before becoming head of design at IDEO.

Hecht and Colin founded Industrial Facility in 2002.

He has taught at the Royal College of Art and as visiting professor of Karlsruhe University.

Hecht and Colin's work is held in museum collections including the Museum of Modern Art (MoMA) in New York and the Centre Pompidou in Paris.

Designs by Hecht and Colin have received numerous prizes including six iF Gold Awards.

Hecht and Colin were appointed Royal Designers for Industry in the United Kingdom in 2008 and 2015 respectively.

In 2019 Phaidon Press published a monograph about Industrial Facility’s work.

References

External links
Industrial Facility site
Pictures of Sam Hecht @ The Design Museum

1969 births
Living people
Artists from London
British industrial designers

Royal Designers for Industry